Shosse Entuziastov is a Moscow Metro station on the Kalininsko-Solntsevskaya Line. It is located between Aviamotornaya and Perovo stations.

The station is named after the Entuziastov Highway, under which it is located. The design theme of the station is the struggle for freedom during Russia's history. Shosse Entuziastov station is decorated in various colours and shades of marble, with colours ranging from dark grey to yellow. Sculptures and pictures relating to revolutionary subjects adorn the walls. On the western end of the central hall there is a large sculpture — "Flame of Freedom" — designed by A. Kuznetsov.

Moscow Metro stations
Railway stations in Russia opened in 1979
Kalininsko-Solntsevskaya line
Railway stations located underground in Russia